Nationality words link to articles with information on the nation's poetry or literature (for instance, Irish or France).

Events
 February 25 – English Queen Elizabeth I awards Edmund Spenser a pension of 50 pounds per year for life (see Spenser's Complaints, in "Works" section below)

Works published

Great Britain

 Nicholas Breton, Brittons Bowre of Delights
 Thomas Campion, Astrophel and Stella
 Michael Drayton, The Harmonie of the Church (republished 1610 under the title A Heavenly Harmonie)
 Abraham Fraunce:
 The Countesse of Pembrokes Emanuel
 The Countesse of Pembrokes Yvychurch, Part 1 adapted from Torquato Tasso's Aminta; Part 2 a revision of Fraunce's translation of Amyntas 1587 by Thomas Watson; volume also includes translations of the second Bucolic of Virgil (first published in Fraunce's The Lawiers Logike) and of the opening of Heliodorus's Aethiopica (see also The Third Part 1592)
 Sir John Harington, Orlando Furioso in English Heroical Verse, translated from the Italian of Ludovico Ariosto
 James VI of Scotland, Lepanto
 George Peele, Decensus Astraeae, a pageant for the lord mayor of London
 Sir Philip Sidney, Astrophel and Stella published (posthumously) first this year from an unauthorized, corrupt text, with 107 sonnets and 10 songs by Sidney, with other verse by Samuel Daniel, Thomas Campion, Greville, Edward de Vere and others, as well as a preface by Thomas Nashe. The text, copied down by an employee of an associate of Sidney, had so many errors and misreadings that Sidney's friends secured all the unsold copies. The volume was then published again this year in a corrected edition, also unauthorized, with 94 sonnets by Sidney and none of the additional poems. (The poem was again published in about 1597, with at least one source, Mona Wilson, stating 1598. This version of the poem, now commonly used, appeared in the folio of the 1598 version of Sidney's Arcadia, although even that version was not completely free from error. It was prepared under the supervision of his sister, the Countess of Pembroke.)
 Edmund Spenser:
 Complaints, including "The Ruines of Time"; "The Teares of the Muses"; "Virgils Gnat"; "Prosopopoia; or, Mother Hubberds Tale"; "Muiopotmos"; "Visions of the Words Vanitie"; the volume lampoons William Cecil, 1st Baron Burghley, who had interceded with Queen Elizabeth I to reduce the handsome pension she had originally promised Spenser (see "Events", above); although this volume was printed, it was suppressed (or "called in") almost immediately
  (although one source states this was the year of publication, another states the work was first published in London in January 1592, according to one source)

Other
 Giordano Bruno, Italian philosopher and poet writing in Latin in a style imitating Lucretius and expressing his philosophical, cosmological speculations in their final form; printed by John Wenchel in Frankfort, Germany:
 
 
 
 Philippe Desportes, Psaumes, France
 Andrés de Villalta. , including a ballad by Miguel de Cervantes, Spain

Births
Death years link to the corresponding "[year] in poetry" article:
 February 25 – Friedrich Spee von Langenfeld (died 1635), German Jesuit and poet
 August 24 (baptised) – Robert Herrick (died 1674), English
 November 2 – August Buchner (died 1661), German poet and critic
 Also:
 Akha Bhagat (Akho) (died 1659), Indian poet, Vedantist and radical
 Jakob Jakobeus (died 1645), Slovak
 Alexander Ross, birth year uncertain (died 1654), Scottish poet, author and controversialist
 Ivan Bunić Vučić (died 1658), Ragusan, Croatian-language poet
 Julius Wilhelm Zincgref (died 1635), German

Deaths
Birth years link to the corresponding "[year] in poetry" article:
 July 22 – Veronica Franco (born 1546), Italian poet and courtesan
 August 23 – Luis de Leon died (born 1527), Spanish
 December 14 – St. John of the Cross (Spanish: "San Juan de la Cruz"; born Juan de Yepes y Álvarez 1542), Spanish (erysipelas)
 Also – Johann Fischart (born 1546 or 1547), German satirist and publicist

See also

 Poetry
 16th century in poetry
 16th century in literature
 Dutch Renaissance and Golden Age literature
 Elizabethan literature
 English Madrigal School
 French Renaissance literature
 Renaissance literature
 Spanish Renaissance literature
 University Wits

Notes

16th-century poetry
Poetry